Storyline Australia is a weekly documentary program, produced and broadcast by SBS TV.

See also 
 List of Australian television series

External links 
  Storyline Australia  Website

2000s Australian documentary television series
Special Broadcasting Service original programming
2004 Australian television series debuts
2007 Australian television series endings